The 2006 Big Ten men's basketball tournament was played between March 9 and March 12, 2006 at the Conseco Fieldhouse in Indianapolis, Indiana. It was the ninth annual Big Ten men's basketball tournament. For the third straight year, the top two seed met in the championship game. The championship was won by Iowa Hawkeyes who defeated Ohio State to win the championship. As a result, Iowa received the Big Ten's automatic bid to the NCAA tournament. This marked Iowa's second tournament championship in three appearances.

Seeds

All Big Ten schools played in the tournament. Teams were seeded by conference record, with a tiebreaker system used to seed teams with identical conference records. Seeding for the tournament was determined at the close of the regular conference season. The top five teams received a first round bye.

Game summaries

Bracket

All-Tournament Team
 Jeff Horner, Iowa – Big Ten tournament Most Outstanding Player
 Maurice Ager, Michigan State
 Greg Brunner, Iowa
 Jamar Butler, Ohio State
 J. J. Sullinger, Ohio State
Source:

References

External links
Official site

Big Ten men's basketball tournament
Tournament
Big Ten Conference men's basketball tournament
Big Ten men's basketball tournament
Big Ten